Communicative assent is a form of deliberative decision making that uses delegable proxy in a very specific way so as to preserve the voters' explicit casting of a vote.  Communicative assent can be used with many different types of vote counting schemes as the process itself is ambivalent to how the votes are tallied.

Practical applications
OccupyWallStreet New York City General Assembly is evaluating a Communicative assent model.

See also 
 Collaborative governance
 Deliberative democracy
 Voting system

References

External links 
 Communicative Assent Standards

Electoral systems